"All That You Love Will Be Carried Away" is a short story by Stephen King. It was originally published in the January 29, 2001 issue of The New Yorker magazine. In 2002, it was included in King's collection Everything's Eventual.

Plot summary
Alfie Zimmer, a traveling salesman peddling gourmet frozen foods, pulls into a Motel 6 in Nebraska for the night. He settles in and pulls out a revolver, ready to commit suicide because he can't "go on living the way he had been living." Alfie has a hobby of recording strange bathroom graffiti which he has discovered on his many long, lonely travels. He starts noting down scrawls on the walls that attracted his attention, gradually becoming fascinated with them. During his solitary travels, he has come to regard these "voices on the walls" as his friends as well as something to think about during the long drive, describing the messages as something precious and important that often "spoke" to him.

Alfie decides that "a shot in the mouth is easier than any living change" but every time he puts the gun in his mouth, he worries that leaving the notebook filled with bizarre ramblings behind will make him seem insane to whoever finds his body. Alfie wants to write a book about the graffiti, even coming up with a great title, but knows "the telling would hurt". While standing in the freezing cold of the winter night, sobbing to himself, Alfie decides on a plan: if the lights of a farmhouse behind the motel reappear through the snow before he counts to 60, he will write the book. If not, he will toss the notebook into the snow, then go inside and shoot himself.

The story closes with Alfie standing near the field outside the motel, starting to count, thus leaving the ending ambiguous.

Film, TV or theatrical adaptations
This story was made into several different Dollar Baby short films. The films were made by Scott Albanese, Brian Berkowitz, Mark Montalto, Chi Laughlin & Natalie Mooallem, James Renner, Anthony Kaneaster, Seth Friedman, Robert Sterling, Hendrik Harms and Chloe Brown.

The most recent adaptation, directed by Bolen Miller 2022 stars John Ennis (Mr. Show With Bob and David, Zodiac, Tenacious D and the pick of Destiny, Walk Hard, Better Call Saul, Twin Peaks: The Return,).

See also
 Stephen King short fiction bibliography

External links
 Stephen King Short Movies

References

2001 short stories
Nebraska in fiction
Short stories adapted into films
Short stories by Stephen King